Alejandro "Álex" Martínez Sánchez (born 12 August 1990) is a Spanish professional footballer who plays as a left-back for CD Eldense.

Club career

Betis
Born in Seville, Andalusia, Martínez graduated from Real Betis' academy, and made his debut as a senior with the C team in 2010. After appearing regularly for the reserves in the Segunda División B, he made his first-team debut on 11 May 2011, starting in a 3–1 home win against CD Tenerife in the Segunda División.

On 27 August 2011, while still registered with the B side, Martínez made his La Liga debut, coming on as a late substitute for Jefferson Montero in a 1–0 away victory over Granada CF. After appearing rarely during the campaign (three appearances, 117 minutes of action), he was definitely promoted to the main squad in the summer of 2012.

On 16 August 2013, Martínez renewed his contract with the Verdiblancos until 2017, and was immediately loaned to second-tier club Real Murcia. He scored his first professional goal on 12 October, the game's only in a home defeat of Girona FC.

Martínez suffered a severe knee injury on 10 November 2014, which kept him sidelined for seven months. He only returned to the fields on 7 June of the following year, replacing Francisco Portillo in a 0–3 home loss to Sporting de Gijón.

On 18 August 2015, Martínez was loaned to Elche CF in a season-long deal. Upon returning to the Estadio Benito Villamarín, he acted mainly as a backup to new signing Riza Durmisi.

Granada
On 26 June 2017, free agent Martínez signed a two-year contract with Granada CF, recently relegated from the top flight. A starter in his first season, he dealt with several injury problems and eventually lost his starting spot to Quini in his second, which ended in promotion.

Martínez was further down the pecking order in 2019–20, after Carlos Neva was promoted to the first team. On 29 September 2020, after just one appearance during the whole campaign, he terminated his contract.

Later career
On 2 February 2021, Martínez joined Hércules CF of the third tier.

References

External links

1990 births
Living people
Spanish footballers
Footballers from Seville
Association football defenders
La Liga players
Segunda División players
Segunda División B players
Primera Federación players
Segunda Federación players
Divisiones Regionales de Fútbol players
Betis Deportivo Balompié footballers
Real Betis players
Real Murcia players
Elche CF players
Granada CF footballers
Hércules CF players
CD Eldense footballers